A fatty acid desaturase is an enzyme that removes two hydrogen atoms from a fatty acid, creating a carbon/carbon double bond. These desaturases are classified as: 
 Delta - indicating that the double bond is created at a fixed position from the carboxyl end of a fatty acid chain. For example, Δ9 desaturase creates a double bond between the ninth and tenth carbon atom from the carboxyl end.
 Omega - indicating the double bond is created at a fixed position from the methyl end of a fatty acid chain. For instance, ω3 desaturase creates a double bond between the third and fourth carbon atom from the methyl end. In other words, it creates an omega-3 fatty acid.
For example, Δ6 desaturation introduces a double bond between carbons 6 and 7 of Linoleic acid (LA C18H32O2; 18:2-n6) and α-Linolenic acid (ALA: C18H30O2; 18:3-n3), creating γ-linolenic acid (GLA: C18H30O2,18:3-n6) and stearidonic acid (SDA: C18H28O2; 18:4-n3) respectively.

In humans, Δ17-desaturase is able to turn omega 6 into omega 3 essential fatty acids.

In the biosynthesis of essential fatty acids, an elongase alternates with different desaturases (for example, Δ6desaturase) repeatedly inserting an ethyl group, then forming a double bond.

Function 
Maintain structure and function of membranes within cells of the organisms above, by its esterification of highly unsaturated fatty acids (HUFAs) into phospholipids, and cell signaling. This is important when temperatures changes and the membrane is under distress. The enzyme creates the double bond C-Cs which allow the membrane to become more fluid and the temperature is decreased. When temperatures change, a phase transition occurs. In the case of a temperature decrease, the membrane gels and becomes solid which can result in cracks and the imbedded proteins cannot partake in conformational changes, therefore it is important to maintain membrane fluidity.

Role in human metabolism
Fatty acid desaturase appear in all organisms: for example, bacteria, fungus, plants, animals and humans. Four desaturases occur in humans: Δ9 desaturase, Δ6 desaturase, Δ5 desaturase, and Δ4 desaturase.

Δ9 desaturase, also known as stearoyl-CoA desaturase-1, is used to synthesize oleic acid, a monounsaturated, ubiquitous component of all cells in the human body, and the major fatty acid in mammalian adipose triglycerides, and also used for phospholipid and cholesteryl ester synthesis. Δ9 desaturase produces oleic acid (C18H34O2; 18:1-n9) by desaturating stearic acid (SA: C18H36O2; 18:0), a saturated fatty acid either synthesized in the body from palmitic acid (PA: C16H32O2; 16:0) or ingested directly.

Δ6 and Δ5 desaturases are required for the synthesis of highly unsaturated fatty acids such as eicosopentaenoic and docosahexaenoic acids (synthesized from α-linolenic acid); arachidonic acid and adrenic acid (synthesized from linoleic acid).  This is a multi-stage process requiring successive actions by elongase and desaturase enzymes. The genes coding for Δ6 and Δ5 desaturase production have been located on human chromosome 11.

Synthesis of LC-PUFAs in humans and many other eukaryotes starts with:

* Linoleic acid (LA: C18H32O2; 18:2-n6) → Δ6-desaturation → γ-linolenic acid (GLA: C18H30O2; 18:3-n6) → Δ6-specific elongase (introducing two carbons) → Dihomo-gamma-linolenic acid DGLA: C20H34O2; 20:3-n6) → Δ5-desaturase → arachidonic acid (AA: C20H32O2; 20:4-n6) → also endocannabinoids. 

* α-Linolenic acid (ALA: C18H30O2; 18:3-n3) → Δ6-desaturation → stearidonic acid (SDA: C18H28O2; 18:4-n3) and/or → Δ6-specific elongase → eicosatetraenoic acid (ETA: C20H32O2; 20:4-n3) → Δ5-desaturase → eicosapentaenoic acid (EPA: C20H30O2; 20:5-n3).

By a Δ17-desaturase, gamma-Linolenic acid (GLA: C18H30O2; 18:3-n6) can be further converted to Stearidonic acid (SDA: C18H28O2; 18:4-n3), dihomo-gamma-linolenic acid (DHGLA/DGLA: C20H34O2; 20:3-n6) to eicosatetraenoic acid (ETA: C20H32O2; 20:4-n3; omega-3 Arachidonic acid) and arachidonic acid (AA: C20H32O2; 20:4-n6) to eicosapentaenoic acid (EPA: C20H30O2; 20:5-n3), respectively.

 Fatty acids with at least 20 carbons (C20) and three double bonds (20:3) bind to CB1 receptors.
 Arachidonic acid (AA) is also the catalyst to the formation of the two main endocannabinoids, Anandamide (AEA) and 2-arachidonoylglycerol (2-AG).
* Anandamide (AEA: C22H37NO2; 20:4,n-6) is an N-acylethanolamine resulting from the formal condensation of the carboxy group of arachidonic acid (AA: C20H32O2; 20:4-n6) with the amino group of ethanolamine (C2H7NO), bind preferably to CB1 receptors. 

* 2-arachidonoylglycerol (2-AG: C23H38O4; 20:4-n6) is an endogenous agonist of the cannabinoid receptors (CB1 and CB2), and the physiological ligand for the cannabinoid CB2 receptor. It is an ester formed from omega-6-arachidonic acid (AA: C20H32O2; 20:4-n6) and glycerol (C3H8O3).

Vertebrates are unable to synthesize polyunsaturated fatty acids because they do not have the necessary fatty acid desaturases to "convert oleic acid (18:1n-9) into linoleic acid (18:2n-6) and α-linolenic acid (18:3n-3)". Linoleic acid (LA) and α-linolenic acid (ALA) are essential for human health and development, and should therefore be consumed by diets, like 15 ml of hemp seed oil, or/and 33 gram of hemp seed protein a day, can provide all the protein, essential fatty acids, and dietary fiber necessary for human survival for one day, as their absence has been found responsible for the development of a wide range of diseases such as metabolic disorders, cardiovascular disorders, inflammatory processes, viral infections, certain types of cancer and autoimmune disorders.

Human fatty acid desaturases include: DEGS1; DEGS2; FADS1; FADS2; FADS3; FADS6; SCD4; SCD5

Classification
Δ-desaturases are represented by two distinct families which do not seem to be evolutionarily related.

Family 1 includes Stearoyl-CoA desaturase-1 (SCD).

Family 2 is composed of:
 Bacterial fatty acid desaturases.
 Plant stearoyl-acyl-carrier-protein desaturase, an enzyme that catalyzes the introduction of a double bond at the delta-9 position of steraoyl-ACP to produce oleoyl-ACP. This enzyme is responsible for the conversion of saturated fatty acids to unsaturated fatty acids in the synthesis of vegetable oils.
 Cyanobacterial DesA, an enzyme that can introduce a second cis double bond at the delta-12 position of fatty acid bound to membrane glycerolipids. This enzyme is involved in chilling tolerance; the phase transition temperature of lipids of cellular membranes being dependent on the degree of unsaturation of fatty acids of the membrane lipids.

Acyl-CoA dehydrogenases
Acyl-CoA dehydrogenases are enzymes that catalyze formation of a double bond between C2 (α) and C3 (β) of the acyl-CoA thioester substrates. Flavin adenine dinucleotide (FAD) is a required co-factor.

See also 
N-acylethanolamine (NAE)

References 

Enzymes